Beseri is a small town in the middle part of Perlis, Malaysia or just near the Tasik Timah Tasoh.

Towns in Perlis
Mukims of Perlis